Barataria is a census-designated place (CDP) in Jefferson Parish, Louisiana, United States. The population was 1,057 in 2020. It is part of the New Orleans–Metairie–Kenner metropolitan statistical area.

Etymology 
The name comes from Bayou Barataria, a tributary of Barataria Bay south of New Orleans. The bay in turn took its name from the fictional island awarded to Sancho Panza to govern, as a prank in Part II of Don Quixote.

Geography
Barataria is located in south-central Jefferson Parish at  (29.715121, -90.116024), on the west side of Bayou Barataria and just east of Lake Salvador. It is bordered to the east, across Bayou Barataria, by the town of Jean Lafitte and the unincorporated community of Lafitte.

Demographics

Barataria first appeared in the 1850 U.S. Census with a total recorded population of 1,176. 

According to the 2020 United States census, there were 1,057 people, 428 households, and 350 families residing in the CDP, down from the 2019 American Community Survey estimate of 1,200 people living in the CDP, and from 1,109 at the 2010 U.S. census. In 2019, the racial and ethnic makeup was 80.7% non-Hispanic white, 7.8% Black or African American, 0.3% American Indian and Alaska Native, and 11.3% two or more races. In 2020, its composition was 84.3% non-Hispanic white, 4.07% Black or African American, 0.76% American Indian and Alaska Native, 0.09% Asian, 6.91% multiracial or of some other race, and 3.88% Hispanic and Latino American of any race. The median household income was $49,931, and 3.3% of the population lived at or below the poverty line in 2019.

Education
Residents are zoned to Jefferson Parish Public Schools.

Residents from K-6 are zoned to Leo E. Kerner Elementary School (formerly Lafitte Elementary School). Those from 7-12 are zoned to Fisher Middle-High School.

See also

Barataria Bay
Jean Lafitte National Historical Park and Preserve - Barataria Preserve

References

Census-designated places in Jefferson Parish, Louisiana
Census-designated places in Louisiana
Census-designated places in New Orleans metropolitan area
Louisiana Isleño communities